Year 1247 (MCCXLVII) was a common year starting on Tuesday (link will display the full calendar) of the Julian calendar.

Events 
 By place 

 Europe 
 War of the Thuringian Succession: The claims on the Ludovingians' inheritance after the death of Henry Raspe, landgrave of Thuringia, leads to a dispute over the succession territories of Thuringia and Hesse, between his niece Sophie of Thuringia and her cousin Henry III (the Illustrious), who claims the territories as fiefs of the Electorate of Mainz. 
 July 2 – King Béla IV grants territories to the Knights Hospitaller in the Banate of Severin and Hungarian Cumania (according to a document called the Diploma of the Joannites), makes an early mention of Litovoi and other Vlach/Romanian local rulers, in Wallachia and Transylvania.
 Summer – Siege of Seville: Castilian forces under King Ferdinand III (the Saint) begin to besiege Seville, the city is isolated and Ramón de Bonifaz sails with 13 galleys up the Guadalquivir River to scatter some 40 smaller Almohad ships trying to oppose him (with many destroyed).
 December 1 – A rebellion arises among the Muslim subjects in the region of Valencia. As a punishment, King James I (the Conqueror), issues an order of expulsion of the Muslims from his realm, leading numerous people into exile in Andalusia and North Africa.

 Levant 
 June 17 – Egyptian forces under Sultan As-Salih Ayyub capture Tiberias and his castle. Mount Tabor and Belvoir Castle are occupied soon afterward. Next, Ayyub moves his army to siege Ascalon – which is defended by a garrison of Knights Hospitaller. They summon the help from Acre and Cyprus.
 Summer – King Henry I (the Fat) sends a Cypriot squadron of 8 galleys with 100 knights led by Baldwin of Ibelin, to Acre. With the support of the Italian colonists, they fitted out 7 more galleys and some 50 lighter ships, to relieve the siege at Ascalon – which is now blockaded by the Egyptian fleet.
 The Egyptian fleet (some 20 galleys) confronts the Crusader ships led by Baldwin of Ibelin at Ascalon. But before contact is made, it is caught in a sudden Mediterranean storm. Many of the Muslim ships are driven ashore and wrecked; the survivors sail back to Egypt.
 October 15 – Egyptian forces under As-Salih Ayyub capture Ascalon by surprise – while a battering-ram forces a passageway under the walls right into the citadel. Most of the defenders are massacred, and the remainder of the garrison is taken prisoner.

 British Isles 
 Battle of Ballyshannon: Norman forces under Maurice FitzGerald defeat a Gaelic army near Ballyshannon in northern Ireland. After the battle, the entire country of Donegal is devastated and plundered by the Normans.
 The Bethlem Royal Hospital is founded in London during the reign of King Henry III.
 Romford (located within Greater London) is chartered as a market town.

 Asia 
 The Hōjō clan under Hōjō Tokiyori destroys the Miura family; and in so doing, the clan consolidates its authority as regents in Japan.  

 By topic 

 Mathematics 
 Qin Jiushao, Chinese mathematician, writes the Mathematical Treatise in Nine Sections.

 Medicine 
 Song Ci publishes the Collected Cases of Injustice Rectified, a book considered to be the first monographic work on forensic medicine.

Births 
 Angelo da Clareno, Italian priest and religious leader (d. 1337)
 Isabelle of Luxembourg, countess of Flanders (d. 1298)
 John II Avesnes, count of Hainaut and Holland (d. 1304)
 John of Montecorvino, Italian diplomat and bishop (d. 1328)
 Philippe de Rémi, French official and seneschal (d. 1296)
 Rashid al-Din, Persian statesman and historian (d. 1318)
 Robert FitzWalter, English nobleman and knight (d. 1326)
 Todros ben Judah Halevi Abulafia, Castilian Jewish poet
 Yishan Yining, Chinese monk and calligrapher (d. 1317)
 Yolande II of Nevers, French noblewoman (d. 1280)

Deaths 
 February 12 – Ermesinde, countess of Luxembourg (b. 1186)
 February 16 – Henry Raspe, landgrave of Thuringia (b. 1204)
 February 25 – Henry IV, duke of Limburg (House of Limburg)
 May 9 – Richard de Bures, French knight and Grand Master
 June 10 – Rodrigo Jiménez de Rada, Spanish bishop (b. 1170)
 July 8 – Mōri Suemitsu, Japanese nobleman and samurai (b. 1202)
 August 31 – Konrad I of Masovia, Polish nobleman (House of Piast)
 November 5 – Ogasawara Nagatsune, Japanese samurai (b. 1179)
 December 21 – Roger of Salisbury, bishop of  Bath and Wells
 December 24 – Shōkū, Japanese Buddhist disciple (b. 1177)
 unknown date – Śārṅgadeva, Indian scholar, musicologist and writer (b. 1175)
 probable – William de Ferrers, 4th Earl of Derby, English nobleman and knight (b. 1168)

References